Wayne Walsh (born 7 May 1946) is a former Australian rules football player who played in the VFL in 1968, then between 1972 and 1975 and again from 1977 to 1978 for the Richmond Football Club and also between 1969 and 1971 for the South Melbourne Football Club.

References
 Hogan P: The Tigers Of Old, Richmond FC, Melbourne 1996
 Richmond Football Club – Hall of Fame inductee: Wayne Walsh

External links
 
 
 

Living people
Richmond Football Club players
Richmond Football Club Premiership players
Sydney Swans players
1946 births
Australian rules footballers from Victoria (Australia)
Two-time VFL/AFL Premiership players